The General Electric YJ101 was an afterburning turbojet engine, as signified by its "J" designation, in the 15,000 lbf class. It was designed for the Northrop P-530 Cobra but its initial application was the Northrop YF-17 entry in the Lightweight Fighter (LWF) competition. It was subsequently developed into the  widely used General Electric F404.

Design
Two essential requirements for the engine were reliability, which can be measured by the number of times a particular engine model has to be shutdown during flight (in-flight shut-down rate), and handling, which means stall-free operation throughout the flight envelope together with allowing the pilot to make unrestricted throttle movements anywhere between idle and maximum afterburner.

The engine used continuous bypass bleed from the compressor to cool the afterburner liner and nozzle. The bypass air was not mixed with hot air from the turbine as the afterburner was a simple turbojet style with no requirement for intentional mixing of the bypass flow with the turbine exhaust. However, mixing is an important requirement for turbofan engines.

General Electric chose to describe the engine differently depending on circumstance. To emphasize simplicity it was a "leaky turbojet". For advanced technology it was "the world's first self-cooled turbojet". This referred to using the compressor bypass air to cool the afterburner instead of using much hotter turbine exhaust gas.

Applications

 Northrop YF-17

Specifications (YJ101)

See also

References

External links

 F404 page on GlobalSecurity.org

YJ101
1970s turbojet engines